Club Deportivo El Nacional Femenino is an Ecuadorian women's football club based in Quito, Pichincha, which plays at Complejo Deportivo El Sauce. The team is part of the sports club C.D. El Nacional. They currently play in the Superliga Femenina, the top-flight women's football league in the country.

History
When Superliga Femenina was created in 2019, El Nacional participated from the beginning; they reached the quarter-finals at the end of the season. In 2020, El Nacional Femenino won their first league title by beating Club Ñañas (2-0, 2–1) in the championship final.

Stadium
The main court of the Complejo Deportivo El Sauce, owned by the sports club El Nacional, is where El Nacional Femenino plays at home, it is located in the city of Quito, in the parish of Tumbaco.

Honors
 National
 Superliga Femenina (1): 2020

References

External links
Official Website 

C.D. El Nacional
Women's football clubs in Ecuador
Association football clubs established in 1964
Football clubs in Quito
1964 establishments in Ecuador